Terbium(III) acetate is the acetate salt of terbium, with a chemical formula of Tb(CH3COO)3.

Physical properties 

The tetrahydrate of terbium acetate can lose hydration at 60 °C, obtaining the anhydrate at 180 °C, which starts to decompose at 220 °C, forming terbium oxide at 650 °C.

References

External reading 
 Lossin, Adalbert; Meyer, Gerd. Anhydrous rare-earth acetates, M(CH3COO)3 (M = samarium-lutetium, yttrium) with chain structures. Crystal structures of Lu(CH3COO)3 and Ho(CH3COO)3 (in German). Zeitschrift fuer Anorganische und Allgemeine Chemie, 1993. 619(9): 1609–1615. ISSN:0044-2313

Terbium compounds
Acetates